Ronja Aronsson (born 20 December 1997) is a Swedish football defender currently playing for Piteå IF.

Playing career

Club
Aronsson debuted for Piteå IF at the age of 13, making her the second-youngest Damallsvenskan player of all time and only seven days older than Catola Karlsson, who held the record. The debut took place on October 8, 2011 in a 2–1 away defeat against Dalsjöfors GoIF where Aronsson was substituted in the 88th minute.

On 12 January 2022, Aronsson joined Fiorentina.

International
Aronsson was part of the squad that represented Sweden at the U19 European Championship in Israel in July 2015, where Sweden won gold.

References

External links
 Piteå player profile  
 Damallsvenskan player profile 

1997 births
Living people
Swedish women's footballers
Damallsvenskan players
Piteå IF (women) players
Linköpings FC players
Serie A (women's football) players
Fiorentina Women's F.C. players
Expatriate women's footballers in Italy
Swedish expatriate sportspeople in Italy
Women's association football defenders
People from Piteå
Sportspeople from Norrbotten County